The Kaiser's Shadow is a 1918 American silent drama film directed by Roy William Neill and written by Octavus Roy Cohen and J.U. Giesy. The film stars Dorothy Dalton, Thurston Hall, Edward Cecil, Leota Lorraine, Otto Hoffman, and Charles K. French. The film was released on July 1, 1918, by Paramount Pictures. It is not known whether the film currently survives.

Plot
As described in a film magazine, a love affair between Paula Harris (Dalton) and Hugo Wagner (Hall), begun in Wilhemstrasse, continues in America where the two, as German spies, obtain employment in the home of Dorothy Robinson (Lorraine), fiance of Clement Boyd (Cecil), an inventor who perfected a rifle. On their wedding day Clement and Dorothy are spirited away to the home of Professor Fredeerick Fischer, a cog in the German spy system. A search of Clement fails to find the plans for the rifle, and Hugo and Paula, who conducted the abduction, are told that they bungled it and will have to answer to "his excellence". The torture of Clement by "his excellence" is halted when Paula tears the mask from his face, exposing William Kremlin (French), a respected citizen. Men from the U.S. secret service arrive and the leaders of the band are killed while the others are taken into custody. Subsequent revelations show that Paula and Hugo were actually both in the service of the Allies and their romance culminates.

Cast
Dorothy Dalton as Paula Harris
Thurston Hall as Hugo Wagner
Edward Cecil as Clement Boyd
Leota Lorraine as Dorothy Robinson
Otto Hoffman as Fredeerick Fischer
Charles K. French as William Kremlin

Reception
Like many American films of the time, The Kaiser's Shadow was subject to cuts by city and state film censorship boards. For example, the Chicago Board of Censors cut, in Reel 2, three scenes of chloroforming a young woman and, in Reel 5, the shooting of a police officer.

References

External links 

 

1918 films
1910s English-language films
Silent American drama films
1918 drama films
Paramount Pictures films
Films directed by Roy William Neill
American black-and-white films
American silent feature films
1910s American films